Union Valley Congregational Church, also known as Union Valley Community House, is a historic Congregational church located at Taylor in Cortland County, New York.  It was built about 1849 and is a modestly scaled, one story meetinghouse building with a mortise and tenon timber frame built on an above grade rubble stone foundation.  It is rectangular in shape, three bays wide and three bays deep, in the Greek Revival style with an overlay of Late Victorian elements.  It features a stout belfry that risesfrom the crest of the roof.

It was listed on the National Register of Historic Places in 2002.

References

Churches on the National Register of Historic Places in New York (state)
United Church of Christ churches in New York (state)
Greek Revival church buildings in New York (state)
Churches in Cortland County, New York
National Register of Historic Places in Cortland County, New York